The Lexington is a pub and music venue on Pentonville Road in Islington, London that opened in 2008. The bar specialises in bourbon, as well as American craft beer. The building it is in was built over 1875 to 1876 and was originally known as The Belvidere.

The venue area is upstairs, with a raised back section by the bar. The front of this has bench seating, but facing away from the stage.

On Monday evenings the pub has a music quiz, previously sponsored by Rough Trade, that is usually hosted by Paul Guided Missile.

History
The building now housing The Lexington was erected in 1875–6. It was then known as the Belvidere, and was a new construction for the earlier tavern of that name on the same site. It was designed by the architect W. E. Williams and built by Robert Marr.

The Lexington was particularly badly hit by a reform of London business rates in 2017, with a proposed increase of more than 200 percent (the average for London music venues being about 38 per cent). The venue challenged this and managed to get somewhat of a reduction to an increase of 118 percent.

The venue's existence has been threatened further by the COVID-19 pandemic. The Lexington were among the beneficiaries of the Cultural Recovery Fund administered by Arts Council England, announced on October 12, 2020. The venue stated that those funds “will go some way in mitigating the financial damage and debt accumulated over the last seven months of closure” but that they are “still in serious peril” as they were only awarded 40% of the funding they applied for. In November the Music Venue Trust announced a campaign which highlighted the 30 UK music venues deemed still in crisis, one of which is The Lexington. The venue are currently running a crowdfunder to raise what is still needed.

Notable performers 
Billy Bragg
Bis
British Sea Power
Camera Obscura
Charlotte Church's Late Night Pop Dungeon
Chris Corsano
Colleen Green
Damo Suzuki
The Darling Buds
The Dream Syndicate
Ezra Furman
Future of the Left
Graham Coxon
The Hold Steady
Iceage
Jay Reatard
Jeffrey Lewis
Joan As Policewoman
Kitty, Daisy & Lewis
Laetitia Sadier
The Monochrome Set
The Pains of Being Pure at Heart
The Pastels
Pere Ubu
The Softies
Speedy Ortiz
Subway Sect
Sun Ra Arkestra
The Thermals
Ulrika Spacek
Vanessa Carlton
Vic Godard
The Wave Pictures

References

Buildings and structures in Islington
Music venues in London
Pubs in the London Borough of Islington